Harry Randall may refer to:

 Harry Randall (British politician) (1899–1976), British Labour Party politician
 Harry Randall (actor) (1857–1932), English comic actor
 Harry Wayland Randall (1915–2012), photographer with the International Brigade
 Harry Randall Jr. (1927–2013), American Republican Party politician from New Jersey
 Harry Randall (rugby union), English rugby union player

See also
Henry Randall
Henry S. Randall